The Lexus Velodrome is an indoor velodrome in Detroit, Michigan, U.S. The  track has 50 degree banked turns. The track opened in January 2018.

References 

2018 establishments in Michigan
Lexus
Sports venues in Detroit
Tourist attractions in Detroit
Velodromes in the United States